Robert Dudgeon may refer to:

 Robert Maxwell Dudgeon (1881–1962), Scottish soldier and policeman
 Robert Ellis Dudgeon (1820–1904), Scottish homeopath
 Robert Francis Dudgeon (1851–1932), Lord Lieutenant of Kirkcudbright